The A584 is a road in Lancashire, England, that runs from Clifton, near Preston, to Little Bispham, in the north of Blackpool. 

Route

Preston and Lytham
It begins in Clifton, west of Preston, as a junction on the A583 Blackpool Road. From here it continues west through Fairhaven and St Annes-on-the-Sea following the coast as it turns to the north, as Clifton Drive.

Blackpool
It continues north up the coast for a further , as Blackpool Promenade (called the Queen's Promenade after Gynn Square), passing through the town centre as well as many well-known landmarks, including the Pleasure Beach, the Sandcastle Waterpark, Blackpool Tower and the town's three piers. The  stretch between Starr Gate and Bispham is also the site of Blackpool Illuminations during the months of September and October. North of Bispham, the road passes through the suburb of Norbreck and the large Norbreck Castle Hotel  before reaching Little Bispham. At this point, it moves inland for roughly half a mile to terminate at the A587 Fleetwood Road, just south of Cleveleys. Between Starr Gate and Little Bispham, the road runs adjacent to the tram tracks.

Roads in England
Roads in Lancashire
The Fylde